Gessa is a surname. Notable people with the surname include:

Andrea Gessa (born 1980), Italian footballer
Cecilia Gessa (born 1977), Spanish actress
Gian Luigi Gessa (born 1932), Italian neuroscientist

See also
Sebastián Gessa y Arias, great-grandfather of Cecilia